Ryan Nicholas Sullivan (born May 3, 1989) is an American professional golfer who currently plays on the Web.com Tour and PGA Tour Latinoamérica.

Professional career
Sullivan turned professional in 2012 and initially played on the eGolf Professional Tour before becoming a member of the Web.com Tour and PGA Tour Latinoamérica for the 2013 season.

In 2013, Sullivan mainly played on PGA Tour Latinoamérica having only making two starts on the Web.com Tour. His first win as a professional came on PGA Tour Latinoamérica at the Puerto Rico Classic

Sullivan qualified for the 2013 U.S. Open for his first appearance in a major championship but failed to make the cut following rounds of 81 and 82. He qualified for the U.S.Open again in 2019 by shooting two under at Woodmont Country Club, tying for 3 and received one of the sectionals four qualifying spots.

Amateur wins (3)
 2009 North Carolina Players Championship
 2010 North Carolina Players Championship
 2011 North Carolina Players Championship

Professional wins (1)

PGA Tour Latinoamérica wins (1)

*Note: The 2013 Puerto Rico Classic was shortened to 54 holes due to weather.

Results in major championships

CUT = missed the half-way cut
"T" = tied

References

External links
 
 

American male golfers
PGA Tour golfers
PGA Tour Latinoamérica golfers
Golfers from Atlanta
1989 births
Living people